Rotting Paradise is the second album from Scandinavian metal band Coldworker. It was released by Relapse Records on May 13, 2008, on both CD and vinyl.

Track listing
"Reversing the Order" (Bertilsson)
"Citizens of the Cyclopean Maze" (music: Jakobson, lyrics: Fornbrant)
"Symptoms of Sickness" (music: Bertilsson/Schröder, lyrics: Pålsson)
"The Black Dog Syndrome" (Pålsson)
"Comatose State" (Bertilsson)
"Paradox Lost" (Jakobson)
"The Last Bitter Twist" (music: Jakobson/Schröder, lyrics: Fornbrant)
"Seizures" (music: Bertilsson, lyrics: Fornbrant)
"The Machine" (music: Fornbrant/Jakobson, lyrics: Jakobson)
"I am the Doorway" (Jakobson)
"Scare Tactics" (Pålsson)
"Deliverance of the Rejected" (music: Jakobson/lyrics: Fornbrant)

Coldworker albums
2008 albums
Relapse Records albums
Albums produced by Dan Swanö